Antonio Marcus Carter (born August 23, 1972 in Columbus, Ohio) is a former running back who played nine seasons in the National Football League for Chicago Bears, New England Patriots, Denver Broncos, and Green Bay Packers.

1972 births
Living people
Players of American football from Columbus, Ohio
American football running backs
Minnesota Golden Gophers football players
Chicago Bears players
New England Patriots players
Denver Broncos players
Green Bay Packers players